Literature of Azerbaijan primarily refers to Azerbaijani literature, or Azeri language literature. It could also refer to:
 Persian literature from Azerbaijan
 Arabic literature from Azerbaijan
 Russian literature from Azerbaijan